The 1995 Academy League was the second tier/division of British speedway. It was effectively the same division of teams that had competed in the 1994 British League Division 3 but was renamed because the British League Division 1 and 2 had merged.

Summary
The title was won by Berwick Bandits who had also won the previous season's Division 3 title.

Final league table

Cleveland Bays withdrew.

Academy League Knockout Cup
The 1995 Academy League Knockout Cup was the 28th edition of the Knockout Cup for tier two teams.

It was only the tier two competition because the Division 1 & 2 had merged, this meant that the newly formed Academy League was tier two of British speedway at the time. Berwick Bandits were awarded the Cup following a first leg final victory, Stoke did not hold the second leg.

Final

Riders' Championship
1st Kevin Little (Berwick)
2nd Chris Cobby (Stoke)
3rd Andre Compton (Buxton)

See also
List of United Kingdom Speedway League Champions
Knockout Cup (speedway)

References

Academy League
Speedway Academy League